Giuseppe Laudati (c. 1672 – after 1718) was an Italian painter of the Baroque period.

He was born in Perugia and studied under Pietro Montanini in that town, and under Carlo Maratti in Rome.  Frezza etched after his works.

References

1672 births
17th-century Italian painters
Italian male painters
18th-century Italian painters
Italian Baroque painters
Umbrian painters
People from Perugia
Year of death unknown
Pupils of Carlo Maratta
18th-century Italian male artists